Buddy's Garage is a 1934 Warner Bros. Looney Tunes cartoon, the last to be directed by Earl Duvall. The short was released on April 14, 1934, and stars Buddy, the second star of the series.

Summary
The film opens to the scene of Buddy happily mending a tire. A litter of kittens are nursed by their mother, fish and ducks swim merrily in a tank of free water, and a responsible car washes itself while Buddy the mechanic squirts oil into all of the necessary sockets. A sleeping dog (presumably Towser) is put to good use, as Our Hero attaches one end of an air hose to the dog's mouth, and the other to a tire. Towser's snoring fills the limp tire with air; a bee puts a canker in the plan by popping the tire with its stinger and scaring Towser awake with the noise. The dog eats the bee, but spits it back out on account of the stinger.

Buddy, meanwhile, plays "By a Waterfall" on a series of files (as if the files were a xylophone), until Cookie appears with Buddy's lunch. The two sweethearts set up to eat: Buddy grinds the skin off of a pineapple, cracks the shells of walnuts with a monkey wrench, and attempts to inflate a small chicken to greater proportions. The chicken explodes as though it was a balloon.

Just then, a large, cigar-smoking character (apparently the same villain from Buddy's Show Boat and Buddy's Beer Garden) drives up to the garage, requesting gasoline for his vehicle. Buddy obliges, and the bruiser steps away to the restroom, where he finds Cookie, whom he decides to kidnap. Buddy dutifully oils his new enemy's engine, but knows that something is amiss when he hears Cookie scream. Rushing inside the garage, Buddy finds the bruiser unfazed by Cookie's blows and demands her release. Challenged by Buddy, the bruiser puts down Cookie, only to be attacked from behind by the girl with a drill of some sort.

The villain chases Cookie, Buddy the villain. At a wall, the villain again takes Cookie, and an indignant Buddy is buried by tires from a shelf that the bruiser intentionally jostles. Freeing himself, Buddy is blasted with ash from the villain's (freshly re-fueled) automobile as it speeds away. Hastening back to the garage, Buddy starts after Cookie and her kidnapper with another vehicle. On the chase, Buddy and his enemy must pass two stopped trucks and freely ignore a "Road Closed" sign. Upon crashing into a large box of tools, the bruiser finds his back tires equipped with saws, which compromise the midsection of a wooden bridge. Passing through the same bridge, Buddy and his vehicle fall into the water below. The hook on the wench of Buddy's truck catches a fish, which then is pursued by hungry cats.

Briefly losing the trail, Buddy speeds as never before once he catches on to Cookie's kidnapper, and, in the process, destroys a laundry truck, whose contents (ladies' undergarments) his vehicle then wears. Where the villain barely avoids a house, Buddy speeds on through it, taking with him a married couple abed. Cookie screams as Buddy approaches, and Buddy winds his truck's wench over to the car in front of him, cleverly snagging Cookie's shirt on it, and thereby carrying her over to his own vehicle. To the villain, he does the same, but does not rescues him. He instead lowers him to the back of the truck so much that his rear end is continually bumped by large rocks and yards of fence. Buddy releases the exhaust at Cookie's would-be captor and the two, safely in the vehicle, happily embrace.

Last Warner Bros. cartoon by Earl Duvall
Earl Duvall would not return to direct another Warner Bros. cartoon. Following Buddy's Garage and the firing of Duvall, all of the remaining Looney Tunes starring Buddy would be supervised by Jack King, Ben Hardaway, and, less commonly, Friz Freleng. The other cartoons supervised by Duvall (Duval) were the Looney Tunes Buddy's Beer Garden and Buddy's Show Boat and the Merrie Melodies Honeymoon Hotel and Sittin' on a Backyard Fence.

Fisk Tires
When Buddy steps out to help his wayward customer, we clearly see a poster of a sleepy child holding a candle & announcing that it is "Time to Re-tire"; this is a clear reference to the advertising slogan, adopted 1917, of Fisk Tires.

References

External links
 
 

1934 films
1934 animated films
1930s American animated films
1930s animated short films
American black-and-white films
Films scored by Bernard B. Brown
Films scored by Norman Spencer (composer)
Films about kidnapping
Films directed by Earl Duvall
Buddy (Looney Tunes) films
Looney Tunes shorts